Jan Autengruber (25 April 1887, Pacov – 15 July 1920, Prague) was a Post-impressionist painter.

Biography
After the early death of his father, his family moved to České Budějovice. After completing his primary education, he was accepted at the Academy of Arts, Architecture and Design in Prague. After two years, he transferred to the Academy of Fine Arts, Munich, where he was a two-time recipient of the annual award.

He achieved very little critical attention in his home country, so he exhibited widely throughout Germany: in Munich, Berlin, Dresden, Mannheim, Hannover, Cologne, Hamburg, and Frankfurt. In 1913, he was awarded a scholarship to study in Italy.

During the World War I, he attempted to avoid being drafted by studying restorative art at the Munich Academy, but it was only a short reprieve and he was mustered into service at Jindřichův Hradec. He managed to survive the war and settled in Prague, where he took courses in art history at the Faculty of Arts, Charles University. 

In 1919, he married the artist Hana Jedličková (1888–1970). The following year, he became a victim of the flu pandemic, dying from a combination of flu and pneumonia.

His wife spent her life promoting his works.

Selected paintings

References

Further reading
Vojtěch Lahoda, Jan Jedlička. Jan Autengruber 1887—1920. ChechArtBooks, 2009  (Review from the West Bohemian Gallery)

External links

Biography and appreciation @ the West Bohemian Gallery
Works by and about Autengruber @ the Databáze Národní Knihovny ČR

1887 births
1920 deaths
People from Pacov
People from the Kingdom of Bohemia
Austro-Hungarian painters
Post-impressionist painters
Deaths from Spanish flu
Academy of Arts, Architecture and Design in Prague alumni